INS Yaffo (אח"י יפו) is an Israeli missile boat, one of ten s. She was launched in 1998 at Israel Shipyards in the Port of Haifa. She has been a part of Israeli Navy since July 1, 1998.

Construction 
New ships were quite longer, in order to take an augmented armament.

INS Yaffo was built at Israel Shipyards in the Port of Haifa. She was launched in 1998 and finished within few months.

Description 

This unit has a flush deck, short superstructure located in front of the midship and freeboard. The full load displacement is 488 tonnes.

The primary armament is two quadruple launchers of American Harpoon anti-ship missiles, allocated directly behind the superstructure.

The secondary armament consists of single, dual purpose gun OTO Melara 76 mm, allocated abaft in a gun turret. Fore, close-in weapon system, Phalanx CIWS, is located.

References 

1998 ships
Ships built in Israel
Sa'ar 4.5-class missile boats
Naval ships of Israel
Missile boats of the Israeli Navy